Pheia is a genus of moths in the subfamily Arctiinae erected by Francis Walker in 1854.

Species

 Pheia admirabilis Bryk, 1953
 Pheia albisigna Walker, 1854
 Pheia attenuata Kaye, 1919
 Pheia beebei Fleming, 1957
 Pheia bisigna Kaye, 1911
 Pheia costalis Rothschild, 1911
 Pheia daphaena Hampson, 1898
 Pheia discophora Dognin, 1909
 Pheia dosithea Schaus, 1924
 Pheia elegans Druce, 1884
 Pheia flavicincta Dognin, 1906
 Pheia flavilateralis Gaede, 1926
 Pheia fuscicorpus Rothschild, 1931
 Pheia gaudens Walker, 1856
 Pheia haemapera Schaus, 1898
 Pheia haemapleura Hampson, 1914
 Pheia haematosticta E. D. Jones, 1908
 Pheia insignis Rothschild, 1931
 Pheia lateralis Klages, 1906
 Pheia marginata Gaede, 1926
 Pheia mathona Dognin
 Pheia nanata Kaye, 1919
 Pheia plebecula Dognin, 1902
 Pheia pseudelegans Rothschild, 1931
 Pheia pyrama Dognin, 1911
 Pheia regesta Draudt, 1915
 Pheia serpensis Kaye, 1919
 Pheia simillima Rothschild, 1931
 Pheia sperans Walker, 1856
 Pheia stratiotes Dyar, 1914
 Pheia taperinhae Dognin, 1923
 Pheia utica Druce, 1889
 Pheia xanthozona Dognin, 1910

References

 
Euchromiina
Moth genera